is a passenger railway station located in Nakahara-ku, Kawasaki, Kanagawa Prefecture, Japan, operated by the East Japan Railway Company (JR East).

Lines
Musashi-Nakahara Station is served by the Nambu Line.

Station layout

The station is staffed and consists of two island platforms serving four tracks. Platforms 2 and 3 are used for trains starting from Musashi-Nakahara, as their tracks in the opposite direction lead to Nakahara Depot. The station has a Midori no Madoguchi staffed ticket office an automatic ticket gates.

Platforms

History
Musashi-Nakahara Station opened as a station on the Nambu Railway on 9 March 1927. The Nambu Railway was nationalized on 1 April 1944, becoming part of the Japanese Government Railway (JGR) system, which became the Japanese National Railways (JNR) from 1946. Freight operations were discontinued from January 16, 1961. Along with privatization and division of JNR, JR East started operating the station on 1 April 1987. The station was rebuilt in 1990, moving 200 meters towards Musashi-Kosugi Station, and with the tracks becoming elevated.

Passenger statistics
In fiscal 2019, the station was used by an average of 34,198 passengers daily (boarding passengers only).

The passenger figures (boarding passengers only) for previous years are as shown below.

Surrounding area
 Fujitsu Kawasaki Factory (Registered Head Office)
Todoroki Athletics Stadium (J League Kawasaki Frontale home stadium)
Kawasaki City Museum
Kanagawa Prefectural Shinjo High School
Kawasaki City Oto Elementary School
Kawasaki City Nishinakahara Junior High School

See also
 List of railway stations in Japan

References

External links

  

Railway stations in Kanagawa Prefecture
Railway stations in Japan opened in 1927
Railway stations in Kawasaki, Kanagawa